This is a list of international visits undertaken by Mike Pompeo (in office 2018–2021) while serving as the United States secretary of state. The list includes both private travel and official state visits. The list includes only foreign travel which the Secretary of State have made during their tenure in the position.

Summary 
The number of visits per country where Secretary Pompeo traveled are:
 One visit to Angola, Australia, Austria, Belarus, Chile, Costa Rica, Croatia, Cyprus, Czech Republic, Denmark, Dominican Republic, Ecuador, Egypt, El Salvador, Ethiopia, Guyana, Hungary, Iceland, Jamaica, Kazakhstan, Kuwait, Lebanon, Malaysia, Micronesia, Montenegro, Morocco, Netherlands, North Macedonia, Panama, Pakistan, Paraguay, Peru, Philippines, Portugal, Russia, Senegal, Slovakia, Slovenia, Sri Lanka, Sudan, Suriname, Switzerland, Thailand, Ukraine and Uzbekistan
 Two visits to Argentina, Bahrain, Brazil, Canada, China, Finland, France, Greece, Indonesia, Iraq, Italy, Jordan, Poland, Singapore and Vatican City
 Three visits to Afghanistan, Colombia, India, Mexico, North Korea, Oman, South Korea, Turkey and Vietnam
 Four visits to Germany and Japan
 Five visits to Qatar and the United Kingdom
 Six visits to Israel and United Arab Emirates
 Seven visits to Belgium and Saudi Arabia

Table

See also 
 Foreign policy of the Donald Trump administration
 List of international presidential trips made by Donald Trump

References

2018 beginnings
2020 endings
Trips made by Mike Pompeo as United States Secretary of State
Trips made by Mike Pompeo as United States Secretary of State
2010s politics-related lists
2020s politics-related lists
United States Secretary of State
S
United States diplomacy-related lists
|Pompeo
2010s timelines
2020s timelines